Yellow Bird Project (often abbreviated YBP) is a company that collaborates with indie bands to raise money for charity, primarily through the sale of T-shirts. They approach indie bands, asking them to choose a charity and submit an original design. Each design is then printed onto T-shirts and sold exclusively through the YBP website to raise money for the charity of the artist's choosing. Some of the bands which they have collaborated with include Andrew Bird, Bloc Party, Bon Iver, Broken Social Scene, Devendra Banhart, and The National. Over the years, the company has diversified to include book publishing, album releases and film projects. In 2016, UK based charity Trekstock took over the management of the project, enabling all funds to be raised for one cause - young adults living with cancer.

Contributors

Publications
In 2009, Yellow Bird Project published The Indie Rock Coloring Book, an illustrated tribute to indie rock bands, with a foreword written by Pierre de Reeder of Rilo Kiley and testimonials from Matt Berninger (of The National) and Russell Lissack (of Bloc Party). To promote the book online they created a collaborative group drawing game called 'Color Me Indie'. They also organised 'The Indie Rock Coloring Book Tour' with live shows and coloring events in book stores across San Francisco, New York and Montreal.

As a follow up publication, YBP released 'The Indie Rock Poster Book' in 2011. Both books (published by Chronicle Books) are intended to raise awareness for their initiative, its contributing musicians, and the charities which they support.

In 2013 YBP self-published a poetry zine, entitled 'Selected Poems by Indie Rock Stars', featuring original and exclusive artwork, poetry and prose from musicians such as Aidan Moffat, Elvis Perkins, Emmy the Great, James Yorkston, Johnny Flynn, Joseph Arthur, Keaton Henson and Robyn Hitchcock. To promote the zine, they created a microsite where you can sign up by email to receive 6 poems in 6 weeks. The microsite also has an area where you can listen to poems as you read them, with dictations from Aidan Moffat (of Arab Strap) and Natalia Yanchak (of The Dears).

Music releases
In December 2013, YBP released a 7" Christmas album, "Wishing for a Christmas Miracle with the Micah P. Hinson Family". The record includes covers of "Silent Night" and "Please Daddy (Don't Get Drunk This Christmas)", a song originally recorded by John Denver for his 1973 album Farewell Andromeda.

On April 14, 2015, YBP released a covers compilation, titled: Good People Rock. The album features 10 exclusive recordings of YBP bands covering other YBP bands, including Andrew Bird, Elvis Perkins, Hayden and Alec Ounsworth (of Clap Your Hands Say Yeah). The album was released by Madic Records, a label founded by Dan Mangan as a subsidiary imprint of Arts & Crafts Productions. It's available in vinyl and digital formats.

Kristian Matsson, who performs under the moniker of The Tallest Man On Earth, wrote and recorded an original theme song for the Yellow Bird Project. The song, "A Field Of Birds", is included as a digital bonus track on the Good People Rock compilation.

Documentary film
In 2016, YBP produced a feature-length documentary, A Matter of Time, about Kathryn Calder (of The New Pornographers) and her mother's battle with ALS. The film was distributed by Kinosmith in Canada and by First Run Features in the USA.

References

External links
 Yellow Bird Project website
 A Matter of Time: Film Website

Clothing companies of Canada
Non-profit organizations based in Montreal
Canadian companies established in 2006
2006 establishments in Quebec
Clothing companies established in 2006